Prolepismina is a genus of silverfish in the family Lepismatidae. There is one described species in Prolepismina, P. tuxeni.

References

Further reading

 
 

Lepismatidae
Articles created by Qbugbot